Viktor Arkhipovich Luferov (Russian: Виктор Архипович Луферов; May 20, 1945 – March 1, 2010) was a  Russian singer-songwriter, multi-instrumentalist, poet, and performer. His songs were examples of the Russian music genre author song.

Life 
Victor Luferov was born May 20, 1945, in Moscow. He studied at the Moscow Engineering Physics Institute and graduated from Gnessin State Musical College and Moscow Veterinary Academy. He worked as a laboratory assistant, billposter, janitor and fireman.

In the late 1960s, he founded and headed the music ensemble "Osenebri" which existed from 1967 to 1970. In February 1985, he founded the Theater of Song "Perekryostok" (The Crossroads), which nurtured and encouraged many emerging singers. It lasted until 2003 when it was closed for financial reasons. Luferov was a member of the creative association "First Circle" (which at various times included Yury Lores, Alexander Mirzayan, Vladimir Berezhkov, and Mikhail Kochetkov) and the Association of Russian Bards. He published seven CDs, four of them in the author's seven-disc anthology titled Every hunter wants to know... (Каждый охотник желает знать...).

Viktor Luferov was interested in ethnographic folklore, which reverberated in his musical creations.

He died of lymphoma on March 1, 2010, and was buried at the Florus and Laurus Church in the village of Yam in Domodedovsky District, Moscow Oblast.

References

Links 
Facebook discussion page dedicated to Viktor Luferov
Viktor Luferov at website of creative union ASIA
Viktor Luferov at bards.ru
Links to selected music albums (CD) by Luferov
Selected MP3 records of songs by Viktor Luferov

1945 births
2010 deaths
Russian bards
Russian singer-songwriters
Russian male singer-songwriters
Soviet musicians
Soviet male singer-songwriters
20th-century Russian male singers
20th-century Russian singers